Melanomphalia is a genus of fungi in the family Tricholomataceae. The genus is monotypic, containing the single species Melanomphalia nigrescens, found in Europe. The species was first described by M.P. Christensen in 1936.

See also

 List of Tricholomataceae genera

References

Tricholomataceae
Monotypic Agaricales genera
Fungi of Europe